The Market Cross is an historic building in the heart of Bury St Edmunds.  As the name implies, The Market Cross marks the site of a crucifix in the centre of the ancient market place which was erected between the thirteenth and sixteenth centuries.

Market crosses symbolised fairness with dealings in the market and were used for preaching and to make public announcements. In 1583 the cross was dismantled and replaced with an open wooden shelter for corn sellers. The building was described as a "very fayer large house for corn sellers wherein they may stand in their great ease very comodiouslye in the heat of somer and also in the tyme of reyne and cold wet winter".

The building was burnt to the ground by a fire that destroyed most of Bury St Edmunds town centre in 1608. At the insistence of King James VI and I, the Corporation rebuilt The Market Cross, and by 1620 a large timber building had been completed. The new Market Cross consisted of an open corn-stead below, and a clothiers' hall on the first floor. During the 1600s part of the open ground floor of The Market Cross was leased as shops.  By 1698 the gallery had a lanthorn or cupola on top of it.  This was one of three in the town, the only one remaining today being that on Cupola House, a restaurant in The Traverse, which is the adjacent street.

Markets have been held in Bury St Edmunds for more than a thousand years and still thrive today, with markets on Wednesdays and Saturdays. Even today, the street names recall their history (for example Butter Market and Hatter Street) describing the goods traded there - beasts, butter, corn, wool and fish.

The Market Cross has had a wide range of uses over the past four hundred years from a theatre and dancehall to a badminton court, and a contemporary art gallery.

The Theatre

In June 1725 the first floor of The Market Cross became Bury St Edmunds' first permanent theatre, The Grand Theatre. Before that, plays had been performed in rented buildings or open spaces. In The Grubstreet Journal of 19 September 1734 it was written "Our workmen are very near drawing to a conclusion the finishing The Grand Theatre, which has been so long fitting up here, for his Grace the Duke of Grafton's Company of Comedians, and when the paintings and everything are completed, it is believed it will equal (if not exceed) any in England, and none can be supposed to come near it for situation; the company are to come from the University of Cambridge, to open at the beginning of our next fair."

Plays produced by the Comedians during their first season included Thomas Otway's tragedy "The Orphan" and Henry Fielding's opera "The Mock Doctor".

"In 1734 the Corporation made provision for both local amateur performances and for travelling companies of players when they converted the first floor of the Market Cross into a playhouse. In 1774, Robert Adam was asked by the Corporation to produce a design for the south front of the Market Cross; his drawing is titled the New Theatre, not the Market Cross; and his design incorporated tragic and comic masks either side of the door. This little theatre served the town well and prospered so much, especially during the time of Napoleonic wars, that William Wilkins, who managed the Norwich circuit of playhouses, was inspired to acquire a site in Westgate Street, on which he built the Theatre Royal, whereupon the Market Cross theatre became the Concert Room."

The theatre was in use for only a few weeks each year during the period of the Bury Fair.  In 1753 it was announced that the theatre would be equipped with boxes and the audience was forbidden to sit on the stage.  It was reported that it had been decorated in a most elegant manner and proved very popular with the aristocratic families of West Suffolk.

In 1774 the famous Georgian architect, Robert Adam was commissioned to re-clad the south end of The Market Cross.  The scheme was later enlarged to include the other three sides and work was finally completed in 1780, although the town had been using the first floor as a theatre for four years.

The exterior of the building remains largely the same today. It is cruciform in plan, the ground floor is entirely faced with chamfered limestone rustications with semi-circular headed openings. At the centre of each of the four facades is a large Venetian window with ionic columns on either side supporting a frieze and pediment.  On each side of the windows are niches carrying Etruscan type ornaments. All the upper windows have balustrading to the sills. Above the windows and niches are stone panels with swags and paterae.

The Adam building was successful as a theatre.  Suffolk County Record Office has playbills for the years 1776-1802.  These record admission prices of boxes 3/-, upper boxes 2/6d, pit 2/6d and to the gallery 1/-.  The theatre asked ladies and gentlemen to send their servants to reserve their seats by 5pm and performances usually began at 6pm and lasted until 11pm or midnight.  Comedies were very popular, although Shakespeare's tragedies King Lear and Hamlet were also performed.

In 1818 the Corporation agreed that a new theatre should be built in Westgate Street.  The present Theatre Royal Bury St Edmunds was opened in October 1819 and over the next 150 years the Corporation struggled to find a use for The Market Cross.  It was used variously as a reading room, concert hall, shops and Mayor's Parlour.  Indeed from 1840 to 1971, the building was known as The Town Hall. Each new function meant the building was altered, leaving little of its Georgian interior. After a fire in 1908 the old theatre galleries were removed and then replaced.

Most departments moved out of the Town Hall when the Borough offices opened in April 1937.

In the 1960s the arcade was filled in, following persistent defacing and a building society occupied the space.  In 1972 Bury St Edmunds Art Society successfully campaigned to turn the upper floor into an art gallery and it occupied the building for many years. The first administrator of the gallery was Mrs Kate Fullbrook and the Venetian chandeliers were donated in her memory by her husband Lt Col Fullbrook, who took over as gallery administrator after her death.  Bury St Edmunds Art Gallery was renamed Smiths Row in 2010.

The high ceilinged upper floor of The Market Cross made it an ideal space for showing contemporary art and many artists created work relating to the architecture and history of the space.

As the Market Cross was a public gallery access was free of charge. It is no longer open, and the gallery plans to move elsewhere.

As of 2021 upstairs is being used as a community space on the top floor and a Betfred on the ground floor.

References

Bury St Edmunds